Epping was, from 1894 to 1955, a rural district in the administrative county of Essex, England.

Formation and boundary changes
The district was formed by the Local Government Act 1894 as successor to the Epping Rural Sanitary District. The rural district was governed by a directly elected rural district council (RDC), which replaced the rural sanitary authority that had comprised the poor law guardians for the area. The council's headquarters were in the town of Epping.

Over its existence, the rural district lost territory to new urban districts. In 1896 Epping became a separate urban district, although Epping RDC continued to be based in the town. Loughton and Chigwell were constituted urban districts in 1900 and 1933 respectively.

Abolition
Epping RD was finally abolished when the New Town of Harlow was constituted an urban district in 1955. The remainder of the rural district was merged with the neighbouring Ongar Rural District to form Epping and Ongar Rural District.

Parishes
When established in 1894, Epping RD consisted of sixteen civil parishes. Over the next sixty-one years the number was reduced due to both loss of territory to urban districts and amalgamation of small parishes. On abolition there were twelve parishes:

References

Districts of England created by the Local Government Act 1894
Political history of Essex
Epping Forest District
Harlow
Rural districts of England